Igor González de Galdeano Aranzabal (born 1 November 1973 in Vitoria-Gasteiz, Basque Country) is a Spanish former professional road bicycle racer and most recently, the team manager of UCI ProTeam . Following a promising start to his career at Vitalicio Seguros, where he finished the 1999 Vuelta a España in second place, González de Galdeano became a key rival of Lance Armstrong in the middle of his Tour de France supremacy. In the 2002 Tour de France, González de Galdeano wore the yellow jersey for seven days and in the 2003 Vuelta a España wore the gold jersey for one day. At an average speed of 55.17 km/h, González de Galdeano also holds the record for the fastest stage win in the Vuelta a España, a feat which earned him the nickname Speedy González.

Early racing career 
González de Galdeano turned professional in 1995 with the Basque team , which at the time was only in its second year of racing and suffering from financial hardship. During his three seasons at Euskadi, González de Galdeano achieved two stage victories and a number of sprints and mountains classifications. For the 1999 season, González de Galdeano moved on to the Spanish Vitalicio Seguros team, and it was in this season that González de Galdeano made a name for himself on the domestic racing scene. Early in the season, González de Galdeano won stage five and finished fifth in the general classification of the Tirreno–Adriatico and adding three more top ten placings in regional Spanish stage races through the season.

Yet, González de Galdeano saved his best for the Vuelta a España in September. González de Galdeano won two stages – a 6 km prologue around Murcia and a mountain stage which finished in Arcalis, Andorra. Despite his excellent time-trialling skills, González de Galdeano eventually missed out on claiming the overall victory of the race when he lost nearly four minutes to the eventual race winner Jan Ullrich on the penultimate stage, a time-trial, and so finished second. González de Galdeano also missed out on the points classification on the final stage when, having taken a lead into the final day, Frank Vandenbroucke was able to breakaway from the peloton and claim the points in intermediate sprints. Nevertheless, González de Galdeano had an excellent Vuelta and raised his profile immeasurably.

ONCE and the Armstrong rivalry 
ONCE targeted the Tour de France as well as the Vuelta a España, so González de Galdeano was able to start his first Tour in 2001. ONCE had a fresh look in this 88th edition of the Tour: Laurent Jalabert and Abraham Olano were gone and the new team leader was Joseba Beloki, who had finished third the previous year for Festina. It was in this Tour that González de Galdeano first demonstrated his excellent time-trialling skills to the world beyond Spain, placing second in both the short prologue around Dunkirk and also the 61 km test from Montlucon to Saint Amand Montrond. González de Galdeano ultimately finished fifth in the Tour and helped Beloki to a second consecutive third place. González de Galdeano also had another good Vuelta, placing fourth in the first stage time-trial and winning a road stage into Zaragoza, breaking clear in the final kilometre to win the fastest ever stage in the Vuelta a España at 55.176 km/h and hence coining his nickname, Speedy González.

In 2002, with an increasing reputation as a time-triallist who was competent in the mountains, González de Galdeano formed a small rivalry with Lance Armstrong, the 1993 World Cycling Champion and already three-time winner of the Tour. In the GP Midi Libre, González de Galdeano beat Armstrong in the time-trial and, following an intense ride by Armstrong in the mountains, eventually finished second in the general classification to him. Battle was resumed at the Tour de France, when in the team time trial ONCE-Eroski beat Armstrong's  squad by 16 seconds to be clear of the American by 7 seconds. González de Galdeano was able to retain the yellow jersey of race leader for seven stages. Although Armstrong did overhaul González de Galdeano and Beloki to claim his fourth Tour, ONCE improved their performance over the previous year: Beloki moved up a step on the podium to second and was clearly Armstrong's principal threat, González de Galdeano once again finished fifth, and with strong riding from team mate José Azevedo, who finished sixth, ONCE was able to claim the team competition. González de Galdeano also added the Spanish national time trial and the overall classification in the Deutschland Tour to his record, along with a bronze medal in the world time trial championships in Zolder.

A doping ban prevented González de Galdeano from taking part in the 2003 Tour de France. González de Galdeano was adjudicated by the French authorities to have doped, for his use of the asthma drug salbutamol. However, the UCI did not count this as a positive test so no sanction was applied. However, the French authorities took a more stringent line and prevented him for racing on French soil for six months, over the period of the Tour. Also, González de Galdeano had a good showing at the Deutschland Tour, finishing second on the fifth stage. However, on the penultimate stage, he crashed and broke his collarbone. As such, the planned appeal against the French ban became academic and González de Galdeano had to wait for the Vuelta. The 2003 Vuelta proved to be González de Galdeano's last Grand Tour as a leading protagonist. González de Galdeano went into the Vuelta as ONCE team leader, however, young team mate Isidro Nozal rode well throughout, until the penultimate stage, a time trial in which he lost over two minutes to Roberto Heras, the eventual race winner. González de Galdeano finished fourth overall.

Retirement and post-racing career 
By the time the 2004 Vuelta had started, González de Galdeano had fallen to the role of domestique for new team leader Heras and his lieutenant Nozal. González de Galdeano retired on his 32nd birthday, on 1 November 2005. He stated that he decided to retire at this relatively young age as "I realized in the last Tour de France that I lost my motivation."

, González de Galdeano combines studying at Basque Institute of Physical Education (IVEF) with being a technical secretary at the Euskaltel-Euskadi team, where he had started his professional career in 1995.  At Euskaltel, González de Galdeano's brief is to manage the team's training and to schedule the team's itineraries through the season.

Grand Tour general classification results timeline

See also 
 List of doping cases in cycling
 List of sportspeople sanctioned for doping offences

References

External links 
Eurosport Profile

Cyclists from the Basque Country (autonomous community)
Spanish male cyclists
1973 births
Living people
Olympic cyclists of Spain
Cyclists at the 2004 Summer Olympics
University of the Basque Country alumni
Spanish Vuelta a España stage winners
Sportspeople from Vitoria-Gasteiz